David Figueroa Ortega (born 6 July 1970) is a Mexican diplomatic and politician from the National Action Party. From 2006 to 2009 he served as Deputy of the LX Legislature of the Mexican Congress representing Sonora, and previously served as municipal president of Agua Prieta.

He also has been Consul of Mexico in San Jose, California from 2008 to 2010 and Consul of Mexico in Los Angeles from 2011 to 2013.

References

1970 births
Living people
People from Agua Prieta
Politicians from Sonora
21st-century Mexican politicians
Municipal presidents in Sonora
Autonomous University of Chihuahua alumni
People from Huachinera Municipality
Members of the Chamber of Deputies (Mexico) for Sonora